Nannaria ohionis is a species of flat-backed millipede in the family Xystodesmidae. It is found in the Midwestern United States.

References

Further reading

 

Polydesmida
Millipedes of North America
Arthropods of the United States
Endemic fauna of the United States
Animals described in 1948
Articles created by Qbugbot